Veberöd is a locality situated in Lund Municipality, Skåne County, Sweden with 5,500 inhabitants in 2014. It is near Vombsjön, the lake that supplies the water to Malmö.

References 

Populated places in Skåne County
Populated places in Lund Municipality